Bell's Bridge is a pedestrian bridge spanning the River Clyde in Glasgow, Scotland. A swivelling swing bridge, it was constructed in 1988 to coincide with the Glasgow Garden Festival, it allowed pedestrians to cross from the main exhibition site to the Scottish Exhibition and Conference Centre on the other side of the river.

The northern stub of the bridge is supported only by the quay, whereas the majority of the bridge consists of a cable-stayed span which can rotate through 90 degrees, providing two lanes of passage for river traffic either side. It is named for the Arthur Bell & Sons whisky company, who sponsored its construction. The bridge was designed by Sir William Arrol & Co. and constructed by John Young and Company (Kelvinhaugh) Ltd.

References

Bridges in Glasgow
Bridges across the River Clyde
Pedestrian bridges in Scotland
Bridges completed in 1988
Govan
1988 establishments in Scotland